Ambohimalaza is a municipality in northern Madagascar. It belongs to the district of Sambava, which is a part of Sava Region. The population of the commune was estimated to be approximately 8,000 in 2001 commune census.

Only primary schooling is available in town. The majority 99.99% of the population in the commune are farmers.  The most important crop is vanilla, while other important products are coffee, cloves and rice.  Services provide employment for 0.01% of the population.

Geography
It is situated along the National road 3b between Antalaha and Andapa.
The small Sambava river flows in the North of the village.

References 

Populated places in Sava Region